The Minister of Trade and Shipping was a councilor of state and chief of the Norway's Ministry of Trade and Shipping. The position was created on 6 December 1947 when the position of Minister of Trade and Industry was split into a portfolio for trade and shipping, and a Minister of Industry. As a prelude, a separate Minister of Shipping had been created between 1942 and 1945 to lead the Ministry of Shipping. The Minister of Trade and Industry had its own ministry until 1988, when the responsibility was taken over by the Ministry of Foreign Affairs. The position was abolished in 1997, when the portfolio was taken over by the Minister of Trade and Industry.

Key
The following lists the minister, their party, date of assuming and leaving office, their tenure in years and days, and the cabinet they served in.

Ministers

References

Trade and Shipping
Norway
 
Ministry of Trade and Industry (Norway)
Ministry of Foreign Affairs (Norway)
Shipping ministers